The 1920 New York gubernatorial election took place on November 2, 1920, to elect the Governor and Lieutenant Governor of New York, concurrently with elections to the United States Senate in other states and elections to the United States House of Representatives and various state and local elections.

Despite losing reelection Al Smith would win the nomination as the Democratic candidate in the 1928 Presidential Election.

Democratic primary

Candidates
 Al Smith, incumbent Governor

Results

Republican primary

Candidates
 Nathan L. Miller, State Comptroller
 George F. Thompson, attorney

Results

Following his defeat, Thompson ran in the general election as a candidate of the Prohibition Party.

General election

Candidates
 Joseph D. Cannon (Socialist)
 Dudley Field Malone, attorney and political activist (Farmer-Labor)
 Nathan L. Miller, State Comptroller (Republican)
 Al Smith, incumbent Governor (Democratic)
 George F. Thompson, attorney (Prohibition)

Results

References

1920 in New York (state)
New York (state) gubernatorial elections
New York
Al Smith